Constableville Village Historic District is a national historic district located at Constableville in Lewis County, New York.  The district includes 105 contributing buildings, one contributing structure, and one contributing site. The buildings are commercial, residential, civic, and church structures built primarily between about 1828 and 1900.  Also included are a rural cemetery dating from the late 19th century, one historic bridge, and an early 20th-century school.

It was listed on the National Register of Historic Places in 1983.

References

Historic districts on the National Register of Historic Places in New York (state)
Buildings and structures in Lewis County, New York
National Register of Historic Places in Lewis County, New York